Robert Reyes is a Filipino-American former professional basketball player. He last played for the NLEX Road Warriors of the Philippine Basketball Association (PBA). He spent his college years in the United States at Flagler College. He was drafted fourth overall in the 2008 PBA draft by the Talk 'N Text Tropang Texters.

He announced his retirement on his Instagram account on December 15, 2016, after playing for eight years in the PBA. He decided to spend his post-retirement stage in the United States with his family.

PBA career statistics

Season-by-season averages
 
|-
| align=left | 
| align=left | Talk 'N Text
| 23 ||	7.4 || .359 || .000 || .444 || 1.7 ||	.4 ||	.2 ||	.4 ||	1.6
|-
| align=left | 
| align=left | Barako Bull
| 23 ||	24.7 || .421 || .000 || .559 || 5.0 ||	.8 ||	.4 ||	.8 ||	5.3
|-
| align=left | 
| align=left | Powerade
| 28 ||	16.0 || .426 || .000 || .769 || 4.4 ||	.8 ||	.4 ||	.7 ||	4.6
|-
| align=left | 
| align=left | Petron
| 38 || 14.6 || .440 || .000 || .654 || 3.2 || .3 || .3 || .8 || 3.8
|-
| align=left | 
| align=left | Air21
| 15 || 15.7 || .426 || .000 || .607 || 4.4 || .8 || .6 || .5 || 4.6
|-
| align=left | 
| align=left | Talk 'N Text
| 22 ||	7.9 || .276 || .000 || .333 || 1.6 ||	.1 ||	.1 ||	.1 ||	.9
|-
| align=left | 
| align=left | Talk 'N Text
| 23 ||	12.2 || .432 || .000 || .543 || 3.3 ||	.3 ||	.3 ||	.1 ||	3.9
|-
| align=left | 
| align=left | NLEX
| 27 ||	8.5 || .500 || .000 || .562 || 2.0 ||	.1 ||	.1 ||	.3 ||	1.8
|-class=sortbottom
| align=center colspan=2 | Career
| 199 || 13.4 || .422 || .000 || .598 || 3.2 || .4 ||	.3 ||	.5 ||	3.3

References

1983 births
Living people
Air21 Express players
American sportspeople of Filipino descent
American men's basketball players
Barako Bull Energy Boosters players
Basketball players from Maryland
Centers (basketball)
College men's basketball players in the United States
Filipino men's basketball players
Flagler College alumni
NLEX Road Warriors players
Power forwards (basketball)
Powerade Tigers players
San Miguel Beermen players
TNT Tropang Giga players
TNT Tropang Giga draft picks
Citizens of the Philippines through descent